Clive Hughes may refer to:
 Clive Hughes (Queensland politician) (1924–2014), Australian politician
 Clive Hughes (Western Australian politician) (1947–1986), Australian politician